Sven Bertil Johansson (10 June 1912 – 5 August 1953) was a Swedish sprint canoeist who won a gold medal in the folding K-2 10000 m event at the 1936 Summer Olympics in Berlin. He also won a silver medal in the same event at the 1938 ICF Canoe Sprint World Championships in Vaxholm.

References

1912 births
1953 deaths
Canoeists at the 1936 Summer Olympics
Medalists at the 1936 Summer Olympics
Olympic canoeists of Sweden
Olympic gold medalists for Sweden
Swedish male canoeists
Olympic medalists in canoeing
ICF Canoe Sprint World Championships medalists in kayak
People from Västervik Municipality
Sportspeople from Kalmar County